The men's 500 metres at the 1996 Asian Winter Games was held in February 1996 in Harbin, China.

Records

500 meters

500 meters × 2

Results

References
Results

External links
Changchun 2007 Official website

Men 500